The Estonia men's national under-18 ice hockey team represents Estonia in international under-18 ice hockey competitions and is controlled by the Estonian Ice Hockey Association.

Tournament record

World Championship
1999 – Finished 4th in Division I
2000 – Finished 2nd in Division I
2001 – Finished in 22nd place (4th in Division II)
2002 – Finished in 23rd place (4th in Division II)
2003 – 2nd in Division II, Group A
2004 – 2nd in Division II, Group B
2005 – 2nd in Division II, Group A
2006 – 3rd in Division II, Group A
2007 – 3rd in Division II, Group A
2008 – 3rd in Division II, Group B
2009 – 2nd in Division II, Group B
2010 – 5th in Division II, Group A
2011 – 4th in Division II, Group A
2012 – Finished in 29th place (1st in Division II, Group B)
2013 – Finished in 28th place (6th in Division II, Group A)
2014 – Finished in 29th place (1st in Division II, Group B)
2015 – Finished in 28th place (6th in Division II, Group A)
2016 – Finished in 29th place (1st in Division II, Group B)
2017 – Finished in 24th place (2nd in Division II, Group A)
2018 – Finished in 27th place (5th in Division II, Group A)
2019 – Finished in 25th place (3rd in Division II, Group A)
2020 – cancelled
2021 – cancelled
2022 – Finished in 22nd place (2nd in Division II, Group A)

See also
Estonia men's national ice hockey team
Estonia men's national under-20 ice hockey team

References

External links
Estonian Ice Hockey Association
IIHF profile
Estonia U18 Elite Prospects

Ice hockey
National under-18 ice hockey teams
Estonia men's national ice hockey team